A narcissistic parent is a parent affected by narcissism or narcissistic personality disorder. Typically, narcissistic parents are exclusively and possessively close to their children and are threatened by their children's growing independence. This results in a pattern of narcissistic attachment, with the parent considering that the child exists solely to fulfill the parent's needs and wishes. A narcissistic parent will often try to control their children with threats and emotional abuse. Narcissistic parenting adversely affects the psychological development of children, affecting their reasoning and their emotional, ethical, and societal behaviors and attitudes. Personal boundaries are often disregarded with the goal of molding and manipulating the child to satisfy the parent's expectations.

Narcissistic people have low self-esteem and feel the need to control how others regard them, fearing that otherwise they will be blamed or rejected and their personal inadequacies will be exposed. Narcissistic parents are self-absorbed, often to the point of grandiosity. They also tend to be inflexible, and lack the empathy necessary for child raising.

Characteristics
The term narcissism, as used in Sigmund Freud’s clinical study, includes behaviors such as self-aggrandizement, self-esteem, vulnerability, fear of losing the affection of people and of failure, reliance on defense mechanisms, perfectionism, and interpersonal conflict.

To maintain their self-esteem and protect their vulnerable true selves, narcissists seek to control the behavior of others, particularly that of their children whom they view as extensions of themselves. Thus, narcissistic parents may speak of "carrying the torch", maintaining the family image, or making the mother or father proud. They may reproach their children for exhibiting weakness, being too dramatic, being selfish, or not meeting expectations. Children of narcissists learn to play their part and to show off their special skill(s), especially in public or for others. They typically do not have many memories of having felt loved or appreciated for being themselves. Instead, they associate their experience of love and appreciation with conforming to the demands of the narcissistic parent.

Destructive narcissistic parents have a pattern of consistently needing to be the focus of attention, exaggerating, seeking compliments, and putting their children down. Punishment in the form of blame, criticism or emotional blackmail, and attempts to induce guilt may be used to ensure compliance with the parent's wishes and their need for narcissistic supply.

Children of narcissists
Narcissism tends to play out intergenerationally, with narcissistic parents producing either narcissistic or codependent children in turn. While a self-confident parent, or good-enough parent, can allow a child their autonomous development, the narcissistic parent may instead use the child to promote their own image. A parent concerned with self-enhancement, or with being mirrored and admired by their child, may leave the child feeling like a puppet to the parent's emotional/intellectual demands.

Children of a narcissistic parent may not be supportive of others in the home. Observing the behavior of the parent, the child learns that manipulation and guilt are effective strategies for getting what they want. The child may also develop a false self and use aggression and intimidation to get their way. Instead, they may invest in the opposite behaviors if they have observed them among friends and other families. When the child of a narcissistic parent experiences safe, real love or sees the example played out in other families, they may identify and act on the differences between their life and that of a child in a healthy family. For example, the lack of empathy and volatility at home may increase the child's own empathy and desire to be respectful. Similarly, intense emotional control and disrespect for boundaries at home may increase the child's value for emotional expression and their desire to extend respect to others. Although the child observes the parent's behavior, they are often on the receiving end of the same behavior. When an alternative to the pain and distress caused at home presents itself, the child may choose to focus on more comforting, safety-inducing behaviors.

Some common issues in narcissistic parenting result from a lack of appropriate, responsible nurturing. This may lead to a child feeling empty, insecure in loving relationships, developing imagined fears, mistrusting others, experiencing identity conflict, and suffering an inability to develop a distinct existence from that of the parent.

Sensitive, guilt-ridden children in the family may learn to meet the parent's needs for gratification and seek love by accommodating the wishes of the parent. The child's normal feelings are ignored, denied and eventually repressed in attempts to gain the parent's "love". Guilt and shame keep the child locked in a developmental arrest. Aggressive impulses and rage may become split off and not integrated with normal development. Some children develop a false self as a defense mechanism and become codependent in relationships. The child's unconscious denial of their true self may perpetuate a cycle of self-hatred, fearing any reminder of their authentic self.

Narcissistic parenting may also lead to children being either victimized or bullies, having a poor or overly inflated body image, tendency to use and/or abuse drugs or alcohol, and acting out (in a potentially harmful manner) for attention.

In most cases, the narcissist will select one child in the family to be the Golden Child, and another child to be the Scapegoat. The Golden Child becomes an extension of the narcissist, who lives vicariously through them. As a result many golden children do not develop a healthy sense of self and struggle with boundaries. Scapegoats, on the other hand, become the receptacle for all the negative emotions of the narcissistic parent, who blames them for everything that goes wrong in the family.

Short-term and long-term effects
Due to their vulnerability, children are extremely affected by the behavior of a narcissistic parent. A narcissistic parent will often abuse the normal parental role of guiding their children and being the primary decision maker in the child's life, becoming overly possessive and controlling. This possessiveness and excessive control disempowers the child; the parent sees the child simply as an extension of themselves. This may affect the child's imagination and level of curiosity, and they often develop an extrinsic style of motivation. This heightened level of control may be due to the need of the narcissistic parent to maintain the child's dependence on them.

Narcissistic parents are quick to anger, putting their children at risk for physical and emotional abuse. To avoid anger and punishment, children of abusive parents often resort to complying with their parent's every demand. This affects both the child's well-being and their ability to make logical decisions on their own, and as adults they often lack self-confidence and the ability to gain control over their life. Identity crisis, loneliness, and struggle with self expression are also commonly seen in children raised by a narcissistic parent. The struggle to discover one's self as an adult stems from the substantial amount of projective identification that the now adult experienced as a child. Because of excessive identification with the parent, the child may never get the opportunity to experience their own identity.

Mental health effects
Studies have found that children of narcissistic parents have significantly higher rates of depression and lower self-esteem during adulthood than those who did not perceive their caregivers as narcissistic. The parent's lack of empathy towards their child contributes to this, as the child's desires are often denied, their feelings restrained, and their overall emotional well-being ignored.

Children of narcissistic parents are taught to submit and conform, causing them to lose touch of themselves as individuals. This can lead to the child possessing very few memories of feeling appreciated or loved by their parents for being themselves, as they instead associate the love and appreciation with conformity. Children may benefit with distance from the narcissistic parent. Some children of narcissistic parents resort to leaving home during adolescence if they grow to view the relationship with their parent(s) as toxic.

See also

References

Further reading
 Gardner, F 'To Enliven Her Was My Living':Thoughts On Compliance And Sacrifice As Consequences Of Malignant Identification With A Narcissistic Parent British Journal of Psychotherapy Volume 21 Issue 1, Pages 49 – 62 (2006)
 Brown, Nina W. Children of the Self-Absorbed: A Grown-up's Guide to Getting over Narcissistic Parents (2008)
 Campbell, Lady Colin Daughter of Narcissus: A Family's Struggle to Survive Their Mother's Narcissistic Personality Disorder (2009)
 Donaldson-Pressman, S & Pressman, RM The Narcissistic Family: Diagnosis and Treatment (1997)
 Golomb, Elan Trapped in the Mirror: Adult Children of Narcissists in their Struggle for Self (1995)
 Hotchkiss, Sandy & Masterson, James F. Why Is It Always About You? : The Seven Deadly Sins of Narcissism (2003) – see Chapter 9 – The Narcissistic Parent
 Little A  No Contact - The Final Boundary: Surviving Parental Narcissistic Abuse (2016)
 McBride, Karyl Will I Ever Be Good Enough?: Healing the Daughters of Narcissistic Mothers (2009)
 Miller A The Drama of the Gifted Child, How Narcissistic Parents Form and Deform the Emotional Lives of their Talented Children, Basic Books, Inc (1981)
 Payson, Eleanor The Wizard of Oz and Other Narcissists: Coping with the One-Way Relationship in Work, Love, and Family (2002) – see Chapter 5
 Pinsky, Drew The Mirror Effect: How Celebrity Narcissism is Seducing America (2009) - see Chapter 8
 Twenge, Jean M & Campbell, W. Keith The Narcissism Epidemic: Living in the Age of Entitlement (2009) - see Chapter 5
 Nemer, Selma The Beheaded Goddess: Daughters of Narcissistic Fathers (2012)

External links 
 Malkin C 8 Common Effects Of Narcissistic Parenting Huffington Post 27 Oct 2016
 Hall JL The Narcissist Parent's Psychological Warfare: Parentifying, Idealizing, and Scapegoating Huffington Post 9 May 2017
 Dodgson L The 5 most common themes in narcissistic families, from 'flying monkeys' to the 'needy sibling' Insider 

Family
Narcissism
Parenting
Domestic violence